Mary Strong (born 1973) is an American sports journalist and yoga instructor.

Strong graduated from Loyola Marymount University, where she was a full scholarship athlete on the women’s Division I volleyball team. She later spent time on the AVP pro beach volleyball circuit.

Strong began her career as a news journalist for NBC and CNN, eventually earning an Edward R. Murrow Award for breaking news coverage. She parlayed her love for sports and broadcasting into a career on the sidelines for Fox Sports Network, covering AVP pro beach volleyball, Pacific-10 Conference football, and poker. She also helped launch the Sports Mix Channels for DirecTV. Strong worked as a sideline reporter for GSN's Extreme Dodgeball as well as Fox Sports Net's Poker Superstars III, NBC's Poker Championships, and the International Pool Tour in the U.S. and Europe. In September 2006, Strong began reporting for NFL Network, covering breaking news on NFL Network Now and NFL Total Access.

Strong is also the founder of The Green Yogi, an eco-conscious power yoga studio, with locations in Manhattan Beach and Berkeley, California.

References

External links 
 

National Football League announcers
Living people
1973 births
Place of birth missing (living people)
American sports journalists
College football announcers